Paul Booth may refer to:

Paul Booth (tattoo artist) (born 1968), American tattoo artist
Paul Booth (cricketer) (born 1965), English cricketer
Paul Booth (rugby) (1865–1914), English rugby union footballer
Paul Booth (labor organizer) (1943–2018), activist and labor organizer
Paul Booth (historian) (born 1946), British medieval historian and teacher
Paul Booth (media scholar), Professor of Media and Cinema Studies at DePaul University

See also
Paul Boothe (born 1954), Canadian civil servant and academic